John Joseph O'Neill (June 25, 1846 – February 19, 1898) was a U.S. Representative from Missouri.

Born in St. Louis, Missouri, O'Neill attended the common schools.
He studied law.
He was admitted to the bar in 1870 and commenced practice in St. Louis.
He engaged in the manufacture of gold pens.
He served as member of the State house of representatives from 1872 to 1878.
He served as member of the municipal assembly from 1879 to 1881.

O'Neill was elected as a Democrat to the Forty-eighth, Forty-ninth, and Fiftieth Congresses (March 4, 1883 – March 3, 1889).
He served as chairman of the Committee on Expenditures on Public Buildings (Forty-ninth Congress), Committee on Labor (Forty-ninth and Fiftieth Congresses).
He was an unsuccessful candidate for reelection in 1888 to the Fifty-first Congress.

O'Neill was elected to the Fifty-second Congress (March 4, 1891 – March 3, 1893).
He successfully contested the election of Charles F. Joy to the Fifty-third Congress (April 3, 1894 – March 3, 1895).
He was not a candidate for renomination in 1894.
He resumed the practice of law.
He died in St. Louis, Missouri, February 19, 1898.
He was interred in Calvary Cemetery.

References

1846 births
1898 deaths
Politicians from St. Louis
Democratic Party members of the Missouri House of Representatives
Democratic Party members of the United States House of Representatives from Missouri
19th-century American politicians